Phase II, Phase 2 or Phase Two may refer to:

Media 
 Marvel Cinematic Universe: Phase Two, six American superhero films from 2013–2015
 Star Trek: Phase II, an unrealized television series based on the characters of Gene Roddenberry's Star Trek
 Star Trek: Phase II (fan series), a fan-created science fiction series set in the Star Trek universe
 Phase II (album), 2012 Prince Royce album
 Phase 2 (album), 2014 Fear, and Loathing in Las Vegas album
 Phase II, a Johnny Smith album
 Phase II Pan Groove, a steel orchestra
 Contracted: Phase II, a 2015 horror film
 Phase Two: Slowboat to Hades, a Gorillaz compilation DVD

Other 
 Phase II clinical trials, the second of the phases of clinical research
 Phase II metabolism, conjugation reactions in drug metabolism
 Phase 2 (graffiti artist) (1955–2019), an American graffiti artist in New York City
 Phase2 International, a defunct cloud computing provider
 Cosmos Phase II, a series of hang gliders
 Phase 2 metro station
 MediaWiki software, formerly named Phase II Software

See also